Chase Parker (born April 3, 1991) is an American professional golfer.

Parker played his college golf at the University of Kentucky.

Parker made the cut at the 2016 U.S. Open and finished 64th.

Results in major championships

Note: Parker only played in the U.S. Open.

References

External links

American male golfers
Kentucky Wildcats men's golfers
Golfers from Augusta, Georgia
1991 births
Living people